Brassard is a surname. It may have derived from brassard, an armband used as an item of military uniform. Notable individuals with the surname include:

 Augustin Brassard (born 1922), Canadian politician
 Derick Brassard (born 1987), Canadian ice hockey player
 François Brassard (1908–1976), Canadian musician
 Gilles Brassard (born 1955), Canadian computer scientist
 Fernando Brassard (born 1971), Portuguese footballer
 Jacques Brassard (born 1940), Canadian politician
 Jean-Luc Brassard (born 1972), Canadian freestyle skier
 Pierre Brassard (born 1966), Canadian actor
 Roy Brassard (1930–2008), Canadian politician
 Vincent Brassard (1919–1974), Canadian politician

French-language surnames